Sheykh Jarrah (also Romanized as Sheykh Jarrāḩ, Shaikh Jarrāh, Sheikh Jarah, and Sheykh Jarāḩ) is a village in Mehraban-e Sofla Rural District, Gol Tappeh District, Kabudarahang County, Hamadan Province, Iran. As  of the 2006 census, its population was 1,074, in 212 families.

References 

Populated places in Kabudarahang County